Ronald Bishop (born 30 May 1931) is a British archer. He competed in the men's individual event at the 1972 Summer Olympics.

References

1931 births
Living people
British male archers
Olympic archers of Great Britain
Archers at the 1972 Summer Olympics
Sportspeople from Liverpool
20th-century British people